Uranometra is a genus of moths belonging to the subfamily Drepaninae. It contains the single species Uranometra oculata, which is found in Cameroon, the Central African Republic, the Democratic Republic of Congo, Gabon, Ghana, Ivory Coast, Nigeria, Togo and Uganda.

References

Drepaninae
Monotypic moth genera
Drepanidae genera
Taxa named by Felix Bryk